Who or WHO may refer to:

 Who (pronoun), an interrogative or relative pronoun
 Who?, one of the Five Ws in journalism
 World Health Organization

Arts and entertainment

Fictional characters
 Who, a creature in the Dr. Seuss book Horton Hears a Who!
 Who, a creature in the Dr. Seuss book How the Grinch Stole Christmas!
 Who, a first baseman in the Abbott and Costello routine "Who's on First?"

Film
 Who (film), a 2018 Indian film
 Who? (film), a 1974 English film adaptation of Algis Budrys' novel (see below), directed by Jack Gold

Music
 The Who, an English rock band

Albums
 Who (album), by The Who, 2019
 Who? (album), by Tony! Toni! Toné!, 1988

Songs
 "Who?" (song), written by Jerome Kern, Otto Harbach, and Oscar Hammerstein II, 1925
 "Who", by David Byrne and St. Vincent from Love This Giant, 2012
 "Who", by Diana Ross from Silk Electric, 1982
 "Who", by Disturbed from Immortalized, 2015
 "Who", by Lauv from How I'm Feeling, 2020
 "Who", by Moonbin & Sanha, 2022
 "Who", by Neil Cicierega from Mouth Moods, 2017
 "Who", by Sugababes, a B-side of the single "Hole in the Head", 2003
 "Who", by Zayn from the film Ghostbusters, 2016
 "Who...", by Ayumi Hamasaki from Loveppears, 1999
 "Who", written by Irving Berlin, c. 1922–1926
 "The Who", by Hieroglyphics from 3rd Eye Vision, 1998

Other media
 WHO (AM), a radio station in Des Moines, Iowa, US
 WHO-DT, a television station in Des Moines, Iowa, US
 Who (magazine), an Australian entertainment magazine
 Who? (novel), a 1958 novel by Algis Budrys

Other uses
  (Unix), a Unix command
 Washington Homeschool Organization, in the state of Washington, US
 White House Office, an entity within the Executive Office of the President of the United States
 Jim Neidhart (1955–2018), American professional wrestler with the ring name Who

See also
 Doctor Who (disambiguation)
 Guess Who (disambiguation)
 Hoo (disambiguation)
 Hu (disambiguation)
 Woo (disambiguation)
 Who? Who? ministry, a 19th-century British government
 Who's Who, several reference publications